This article lists the heads of government of the Central African Republic. There have been twenty-five heads of government of the Central African Republic and the Central African Empire. The office of Prime Minister, the head of government, was created when the Central African Republic became an autonomous territory of France in December 1958. It was originally the highest post of the Central African Republic, though France did maintain a governor in the territory. After the Central African Republic declared its independence and became a republic on 13 August 1960, David Dacko held both the Prime Minister and newly created President of the Central African Republic posts briefly before eliminating the Prime Minister position and placing all executive power in the office of the President.

President Jean-Bédel Bokassa restored the office of Prime Minister to assist him in governing the country in 1975, shortly before he declared himself Emperor. He selected Elisabeth Domitien to become Africa's first female head of government. After Domitien was removed from office, Bokassa named Ange-Félix Patassé to become his next Prime Minister. Patassé continued serving as Prime Minister after Bokassa declared the establishment of the Central African Empire in December 1976. Henri Maïdou succeeded Patassé and continued serving as Prime Minister after Bokassa was overthrown from power. During the following two years of Dacko's presidency, three more politicians served as Prime Minister. The post was abolished when Dacko was overthrown from the presidency by Andre Kolingba on 1 September 1981. The position, as it exists today, was recreated in 1991, when President Kolingba was forced to relinquish some of the executive power. The President has the authority to name the Prime Minister and can remove them from office at any time. The Prime Minister is the head of the government; within days of being appointed, they must select individuals for their Cabinet, who they will work with to coordinate the government.

According to a ceasefire agreement signed between the government and the Séléka rebel coalition on 11 January 2013, President François Bozizé was required to appoint a new Prime Minister from the political opposition after the National Assembly of the Central African Republic is dissolved and legislative elections are held. According to the agreement, this will happen on 11 January 2014 at the latest. Nicolas Tiangaye, who was selected as Prime Minister by the opposition and rebels, was appointed as Prime Minister on 17 January 2013.

The current Prime Minister of the Central African Republic is Félix Moloua, since 7 February 2022.

Political affiliations 
Political parties

Other factions

For heads of government with multiple affiliations, the political party listed first is the party the person was affiliated with at the beginning of the tenure.

Heads of government

Footnotes 
 Goumba had served as President of the Government Council since 26 July 1958. When the Central African Republic became a territorial autonomy, he served as the acting leader the government from 1 December 1958 to 8 December 1958.
 Boganda was killed in a mysterious plane crash on 29 March 1959, while en route to Bangui. The exact cause of the crash was not determined, but sabotage was widely suspected. Experts found a trace of explosives in the plane's wreckage, but revelation of this detail was withheld. Although those responsible for the crash were never identified, people have suspected the French secret service, and even Boganda's wife, of being involved.
 Dacko removed the Prime Minister position and consolidated power in the Presidency.
 President for Life Jean-Bédel Bokassa established a new government on 2 January 1975 and reintroduced the position of Prime Minister. He appointed Domitien as president of MESAN and Prime Minister of the Central African Republic.
 Domitien was removed from office because she publicly expressed her disapproval of Bokassa's plans to establish a monarchy in the Central African Republic. Bokassa then had her placed under house arrest.
 On 4 December 1976, Bokassa instituted a new constitution and declared the republic a monarchy, the Central African Empire.
 President Dacko appointed Maïdou as Vice President on 27 September 1979.
 Prime Minister Ayandho was dismissed from office on 22 August 1980 by Dacko, who saw him as a political threat, and placed under house arrest.
 Dacko created the Central African Democratic Union in February 1980 as the country's only political party.
 Malendoma was removed as Prime Minister and replaced by Lakoué.
 In April 1995, Mandaba resigned as Prime Minister, preempting a threatened vote of no-confidence from his own party, following accusations of incompetence and corruption.
 Gbezera-Bria was named Prime Minister on 30 January 1997 to replace Ngoupande, who had been accused of siding with disgruntled soldiers, who had sparked a mutiny on 15 November 1996 to demand higher wages. Ngoupande also didn't strongly support President Patassé's decision to call in French troops to suppress the soldier uprising.
 President Patassé fired Dologuélé on 1 April 2001 and replaced him with Ziguélé, a senior diplomat who had served as ambassador to Benin for the last two years. Patassé did not provide an explanation for his decision, but political observers state that the nonpartisan Dologuélé had become widely unpopular with the ruling MLPC party.
 Ziguélé left office when François Bozizé seized power on 15 March 2003.
 On 11 December 2003, Goumba was dismissed as Prime Minister and was appointed as Vice President.
 Gaombalet resigned as Prime Minister on 11 June 2005 after being elected as Speaker of the National Assembly on 7 June.
 In mid-January 2008, members of the National Assembly filed a censure motion against the Doté government, in response to countrywide civil service strike initiated by trade unions to protest the government's failure to pay arrears to government employees. On 18 January, Doté announced his resignation as Prime Minister.
 Tiangaye resigned with President Michel Djotodia in N'Djamena, Chad on 10 January 2014.

Timeline

See also 
 Emperor of Central Africa
 List of heads of state of the Central African Republic
 Vice President of the Central African Republic
 List of colonial governors of Ubangi-Shari
 Lists of office-holders

References 
General
.
 .
 .
 .
 .
 .
 .
 .
 .

Specific

External links 
 Elections in the Central African Republic
 BBC News Timeline: Central African Republic

Central African Republic
Heads of government

Heads of government
Heads of government
Heads of government